The AN/SPN-46(V)2 is a ground-based Precision Approach and Landing System, built by Textron Systems. It is used for PALS training of pilots, operators and maintenance personnel.

History
The AN/SPN-46(V)2 was made to replace AN/SPN-42(T)1, AN/SPN-42(T)3, and AN/SPN-42(T)4 radar systems.

Specifications
The system functions very similarly to the AN/SPN-46(V)1 system, which is carrier based, and not ground-based.

References

Avionics